Odry  is a village in the administrative district of Gmina Czersk, within Chojnice County, Pomeranian Voivodeship, in northern Poland.

Odry is home to the greatest concentration of stone circles of the Wielbark Culture in Pomerania in today's Poland; the site contains at least 602 burial sites.

See also
History of Pomerania

References

Odry